Gonzalo de Aguilera Munro, 11th Conde de Alba de Yeltes (26 December 1886 – 15 May 1965) was a Spanish aristocrat and military officer who served with the nationalist faction of the Spanish Army during the Spanish Civil War. He served as the press officer for General Francisco Franco and General Emilio Mola. He inherited the title of El XI  (English: The 11th Count of Alba de Yeltes) in 1919.

Gonzalo de Aguilera Munro was born in Madrid on 26 December 1886, the son of Lieutenant Colonel Agustín Aguilera y Gamboa, 10th Conde de Alba de Yeltes, an officer in the Spanish Cavalry. His mother, Mary Munro, was Scottish. He was educated in England, first at Wimbledon College and then at Stonyhurst College, a Jesuit public school in Lancashire where his father had been a pupil.

It is alleged that Gonzalo, 11th Conde de Alba de Yeltes, carried out many atrocities during the Spanish Civil War. At the outbreak of the war, according to his own account, the Conde de Alba de Yeltes lined up the labourers on his estate and shot six of them as a lesson to the others.

As the press officer of the nationalist faction during the Spanish Civil War, de Alba de Yeltes worked with war correspondents covering the war, including Sefton Delmer, Arnold Lunn and Hubert Renfro Knickerbocker.

As he got older, the Conde seemed to suffer increasingly from mental instability. On 26 August 1964, he shot dead both his adult sons in the family mansion near Salamanca. He was subsequently incarcerated in an asylum in Salamanca, where he died the following year, having never stood trial for killing his sons.

References

Further reading

1886 births
1965 deaths
Military personnel from Madrid
Counts of Spain
Spanish army officers
Spanish military personnel of the Spanish Civil War (National faction)
Francoist Spain
People educated at Wimbledon College
People educated at Stonyhurst College